The 1896–97 season was the fifth season in Liverpool F.C.'s existence, and was their fourth year in The Football League, in which they competed in the first division. The season covers the period from 1 July 1896 to 30 June 1897. 

Liverpool played their first ever game in red shirts and white shorts in a 2-1 away win against The Wednesday on 1 September 1896, this was also new manager Tom Watson's first game in charge.	

Liverpool won the Bass Charity Vase after a 1-0 win against Burton Wanderers on 21 April.

References

External links
LFC History Season 1896-97
1895–96 Liverpool F.C.Results
LFC Kit 1895-96

1896-1897
English football clubs 1896–97 season